Nathaniel Buzolic (born 4 August 1989) is an Australian actor. He was the host of Nine Network's late-night television quiz show The Mint, and had a regular role on the BBC soap opera Out of the Blue (2008). He was also a co-host of the educational show Weather Ed on The Weather Channel. He is also known for his role as Kol Mikaelson on the CW show The Vampire Diaries and its spin-off The Originals.

Early life
Buzolic is a first-generation Australian, and is of Croatian descent. Buzolic studied at De La Salle College Ashfield, and later attended the Australian Theatre for Young People (ATYP) in Sydney and later studied at Screenwise Acting School for Film and Television, graduating in 2004.

Career
Buzolic hosted the Disney Channel's afternoon kids show Studio Disney (2005). He has also appeared in All Saints (2003), Home and Away (2002) and an uncredited role in an episode of Water Rats (2001).

Buzolic's played the title role in the feature comedy Offing David (2008) alongside fellow Australian actor Adam J. Yeend. Previously, he had minor roles in the 2007 Australian short films Road Rage and My Greatest Day Ever.

In 2011, it was confirmed that Buzolic would play Kol Mikaelson in the CW series The Vampire Diaries. He reprised his role in the pilot episode of The Vampire Diaries spin-off series The Originals. It was reported on 30 May 2014 that Buzolic would return to The Originals for its second season and he appeared in the first trailer that debuted at the 2014 San Diego Comic Con.

On 20 February 2014, it was announced that Buzolic had landed one of the lead roles in Supernatural: Bloodlines, a spin-off of the CW series Supernatural, with the twentieth episode of the latter's ninth season serving as a backdoor pilot. However, The CW passed on the pilot in May 2014. In March 2014, Buzolic appeared in two episodes of the fourth season of ABC Family's Pretty Little Liars as Dean Stavros, Spencer's (Troian Bellisario) substance abuse counselor. He reprised his role in the fifth and sixth episodes of the sixth season. In March 2022 it was announced that he would appear in Legacies as Kol Mikaelson.

Personal life
Buzolic is a born-again Christian.

Filmography

Film

Television

Web

References

External links

 
 
 

21st-century Australian male actors
Australian game show hosts
Australian male film actors
Australian male television actors
Australian people of Croatian descent
Living people
Male actors from Sydney
1983 births